Jalapahar is a ridge as well as a locality in the hilly town of Darjeeling in the Indian state of West Bengal. There was a British military camp in this locality in the Raj days. This ridge meets Katapahar ridge at Observatory Hill. St. Paul's School, one of the oldest public schools, is located here. Jalapahar gives a breath-taking view of Darjeeling town nestling under the majestic peak of Kanchenjanga.

The range on which Darjeeling is located is Y-shaped with the base resting at Katapahar and Jalapahar and two arms diverging north of Observatory Hill. The north-eastern arm dips suddenly and ends in the Lebong spur, while the north-western arm passes through North Point and ends in the valley near Tukver Tea Estate.

A famous structure in Jalapahar is Bryanstone, built in 1848. It was the residence of two great Indologists, J.D.Hooker and Brian Hodgson. St. Paul's School was transferred to Darjeeling in 1864. It occupies, among other buildings, the old manor Bryanstone.

References

External links
  Satellite map

Darjeeling
Villages in Darjeeling district